Khalifa Salman (Arabic: خليفة سلمان) (born 25 November 1995) is a Qatari footballer who plays as a winger.

Career

Lekhwiya
Khalifa Salman started his career at Lekhwiya and is a product of the Aspire Academy's youth system.

Muaither
On 1 October 2016, left Lekhwiya and signed with Muaither. On 1 December 2016, Khalifa Salman made his professional debut for Muaither against Umm Salal in the Pro League, replacing Omar Abdelwasea.

External links

References

Living people
1995 births
Qatari footballers
Lekhwiya SC players
Muaither SC players
Al Bidda SC players
Qatar Stars League players
Qatari Second Division players
Association football wingers
Place of birth missing (living people)